Arch Allies is a live album recorded by REO Speedwagon and Styx at Riverport Amphitheatre (now Hollywood Casino Amphitheater) in Maryland Heights, Missouri, a suburb of St. Louis. It was released on September 26, 2000, by Sanctuary Records, and a single DVD was also released on November 7, 2000.

Each band also released single live albums containing only their own tracks from this album. This includes songs cut from the combined release. The Styx songs were released alone as At the River's Edge: Live in St. Louis (also including the songs "Everything Is Cool" and "Lorelei") and the REO Speedwagon songs (including "Keep Pushin'", "Tough Guys" and "That Ain't Love") were released as Live Plus and Extended Versions.

Background
According to REO Speedwagon vocalist/rhythm guitarist Kevin Cronin, the tour sampled on the album was the first time REO Speedwagon and Styx had ever played together, and "We hit it off so well, we ended up putting on a double live CD together. It’s just been a tremendous synergy between the bands on a personal level and on a musical level as well. Tommy Shaw and I have become really good friends."

Reception

Allmusic gave the video release a rave review, opining that both bands gave strong performances and gel together "surprisingly well" in the collaborative jam which ends the album. The review especially praised the performances of new Styx members Glen Burtnik, Todd Sucherman, and Lawrence Gowan, comparing the Styx lineup favorably to that of the band's commercial heyday.

Track listing

Styx

REO Speedwagon

The DVD of the show omits "The Grand Illusion" from the Styx set and "Roll With The Changes" from the REO Speedwagon set (although the jam version with Styx is still present at the end).

Personnel 
Styx 
Tommy Shaw - guitar, vocals
Lawrence Gowan - keyboards, vocals
James "J.Y." Young, guitar, vocals 
Glen Burtnik - bass, guitar, vocals
Chuck Panozzo - bass 
Todd Sucherman - drums

REO Speedwagon
Kevin Cronin - lead vocals, rhythm guitar, piano
Dave Amato - lead guitar, backing vocals
Bruce Hall - bass, backing and lead vocals
Neal Doughty - keyboards
Bryan Hitt - drums

References

External links 
 Arch Allies: Live at Riverport at AllMusic

REO Speedwagon albums
Split albums
2000 live albums
Styx (band) live albums
Sanctuary Records live albums